This is a list of the main mosques in Albania.

Mosques
740 mosques were destroyed by communist authorities in 1967 when state atheism was first introduced in the country.

See also 
 Islam in Albania

References 

Albania
 
Mosques